The 2017 GCI Great Alaska Shootout was the 39th and last edition of the Great Alaska Shootout, an annual college basketball tournament that featured colleges from all over the United States. All games were played at the Alaska Airlines Center in Anchorage, Alaska. The event took place November 21 through November 25, 2017 with eight schools participating in the men's tournament and four in the women's tournament. The men's first round, semifinals, and championship game were televised on CBS Sports Network. Central Michigan won the men's tournament, defeating Cal State Bakersfield. In the women's tournament, Alaska Anchorage defeated Tulsa.

Brackets 
* – Denotes overtime period

Men's

Women's

References

Great Alaska Shootout
Great Alaska Shootout
Great Alaska Shootout
2017 in sports in Alaska
November 2017 sports events in the United States